Inés Granollers i Cunillera (born 17 September 1970) is a Spanish businesswoman and politician who serves as Member of the Congress of Deputies of Spain.

Early life
Granollers was born on 17 September 1970 in Bellpuig, Catalonia.

Career
Granollers owns a small business. At the 2015 local elections she was placed second on the Fem Bellpuig-Acord Municipal (FB-AM)  electoral alliance's list of candidates in Bellpuig, but the alliance managed to win only one seat in the municipality, and, as a result, she failed to get elected. She contested the 2019 general election as a Republican Left of Catalonia–Sovereigntists electoral alliance candidate in the Province of Lleida and was elected to the Congress of Deputies. She contested the 2019 local elections as an Acord Municipal Republicà-Acord Municipal (AMR-AM) electoral alliance candidate in Bellpuig and was elected.

Electoral history

References

External links
 

1970 births
Businesspeople from Catalonia
Women politicians from Catalonia
Living people
Members of the 13th Congress of Deputies (Spain)
Municipal councillors in the province of Lleida
People from Urgell
Republican Left of Catalonia politicians
Women members of the Congress of Deputies (Spain)
Members of the 14th Congress of Deputies (Spain)